The First Baptist Church (also known as the Negro Baptist Church and the Elm Street Baptist Church) is a historic Baptist church located at Elm and Sinclair Sts. in West Baden Springs, Indiana.  It was built in 1920, and is a one-story, rectangular, vernacular Late Gothic Revival style frame building. It features a square projecting belfry.  At the time of its listing, the property was then vacant, and was owned by the West Baden Historical Society.  It was deemed significant in the area of "Ethnic heritage: Black".

It was listed on the National Register of Historic Places in 1994.

References

External links 
More photos of the First Baptist Church of West Baden Springs, Indiana at Wikimedia Commons

African-American history of Indiana
Baptist churches in Indiana
Gothic Revival church buildings in Indiana
Churches on the National Register of Historic Places in Indiana
Churches completed in 1920
Churches in Orange County, Indiana
National Register of Historic Places in Orange County, Indiana